JSS Science and Technology University, or in its full name Jagadguru Sri Shivarathreeshwara Science and Technology University, formerly Sri Jayachamarajendra College of Engineering (SJCE), is a private university located in Mysore, Karnataka, India. Established in 1963 as SJCE has 12 departments in engineering, a Master of Computer Applications department. It was affiliated to the Visvesvaraya Technological University, Belgaum, but now it's a part of JSS Science and Technology University from 2016 - 2017 academic year.   SJCE is accredited by the All India Council for Technical Education (AICTE), all its departments are accredited by the National Board of Accreditation (NBA). It was founded and is managed by the JSS Mahavidyapeetha.

History

Sri Jayachamarajendra College of Engineering which was the dream child of Dr Sri Sri Shivarathri Rajendra Mahaswamigalavaru the 23rd pontiff of Suttur Matt was officially inaugurated in 1963 by Dr. T. M. A. Pai, who was the then Chairman of the Manipal Academy of Higher Education. Courses in Civil, Electrical and Mechanical Engineering branches were started first. The first batch of engineering graduates completed their course in 1968. Electronics and Communication branch of engineering was introduced in 1968 followed by bachelor's degree in Instrumentation in 1978, Computer Science and Engineering during 1982, Polymer Science and Technology in 1992 and Information Science and Engineering in the year 2000.

Rankings

The National Institutional Ranking Framework (NIRF) ranked it 158 among engineering colleges in 2022.

Campus

The campus is spread over  .It is located adjacent to Manasa Gangothri (the campus of the University of Mysore) and the All India Institute of Speech and Hearing.

JSS International Institute of Professional Studies
This was established in 1998 with the objective of helping JSS Students who are planning to go abroad for further studies.  JSS IIPS is a recognized center of Edexcel, London to offer Edexcel courses in India.  JSS IIPS is offering National Diploma (ND) and Higher National Diploma (HND) courses of Edexcel.  Mahavidyapeetha has entered into an agreement with University of Teesside, Middlesbrough, UK and University of West Virginia, USA for transfer of students.  ND and HND completed students can join UK or USA Universities to pursue their studies further.

Facilities

Library and Information Centre
The centre is equipped with over 70,000 volumes related to science and engineering, encyclopedias, dictionaries, and over a hundred magazines and journals every month. It has a collection of ISI specifications, Project Reports and Dissertations, Doctoral Thesis and Proceedings of Conferences and Monographs. It provides audio visual facilities, photo copying facilities, and a book bank.

Auditorium
The auditorium Hall, located on one side of the staff room besides the civil engineering department, can accommodate 300 people. Complete with videorama, slide projector, LCD and overhead projector, and sound system, it is used for seminars, meetings, group use of audiovisual material, etc.

Physical education
Football, hockey and cricket ground respectively, basketball, tennis, table tennis and volleyball courts respectively have been maintained by the Department of Physical Education. Outdoor and indoor recreation facility is available both during and after college hours, in its sports complex building. The college's sports council conducts annual sport events. Inter-collegiate and VTU tournaments are organized. The college also started multi-speciality Gym in 2007. Softball is also gaining popularity.

Hostels
The College has separate hostel facilities for about 500 boys and 210 girls. The boys' hostel is located in the college premises, in H Block, L Block, M Block, PG Block and GH Block, all located on the north-end of the campus. The hostel runs a mess. A separate TV room and reading room are provided in the Boys' Hostel. The girls hostel is located on the south-end of the campus. Another girls hostel is located approximately 3 Kilometres away from the college, in Hootagalli industrial estate.

Health care
A Health Care Unit has been provided on the campus with a qualified physician. The centre works between 10.00 a.m and 2.00 p.m on all working days. However this is no longer available.

Scholarships and awards
SJCE offers scholarships and awards to students for their future education, and benefits based on their performance. The eligible students can apply for fee concession or scholarship. Endowment scholarships are also available.

Extracurricular activities
The college has a quiz club - The Greycells. The club was started in 1999. The weekly quiz is 'WeKuiz' The SJCE students have twice won (2001 and 2003) the Times of India Ascent Quiz conducted by the Times Group in addition to other intercollegiate quizzes held in and around the city.

CSI-SJCE and IEEE-SJCE chapters conduct weekly events ranging from aptitude and technical tests to workshops. They conduct annual technical fests which are attended by students from around the nation. The CSI conducts its annual technical fest "Technologix" during the even semester. IEEE-SJCE conducts its annual technical fest "Cyberia" in every even semester and open-source fest "Tuxedo" in every odd semester. IEEE-SJCE also conducts various hands on workshop for robotics and electronics enthusiasts and has been recognized for the same in IEEE student activities community. MEA (Mechanical Engineers Association) also actively conducts events and fests. The previous fest named 'MECHmerize-2015' featured many events and competitions of which the Autoexpo had a huge following and fun events like PC gaming, RC car racing, etc. Also the association organises many industrial visits frequently. MCA Association conducts a two-day national level technical fest called as INFOTSAV.

The expertise of the Linux Campus Club - SJCE has a goal of fostering the use of free open source software among the students. Its activities include sessions on tools, packages, programming languages and other technical topics related to FOSS, and talks by members of the open source community.

The college magazine editorial board is JC ED , they release an annual magazine Jayzine. They organize a yearly literary extravaganza called 'Shabd'. The college's annual fest 'Jayciana' is one of the popular student events in the state.

Sahas - SJCE Adventure Club which organizes trekking, rafting, and mountaineering.

Notable alumni

Notable alumni include:
Narayan Iyengar, Chief Operating Officer, Dish Network Inc
Akhilesh Yadav, former UP Chief Minister
Shanmughan Manjunath, former IOCL officer
Javagal Srinath, cricketer, India
 Prahlad Srinath, tennis player
 Vijay Prakash, playback singer
Nidhi Subbaiah, model and actress
Dhananjay (actor)
Rishi (Kannada actor)
Meghana Shanbough, Karnataka’s 1st woman fighter pilot

Distinguished faculty
Prof. Chidananda Gowda, former Vice Chancellor of Kuvempu University.

References

External links

 

Educational institutions established in 1963
Universities in Mysore
1963 establishments in Mysore State
Private universities in India